Natibpur is a census town in Domjur CD Block of Howrah Sadar subdivision in Howrah district in the Indian state of West Bengal. It is a part of Kolkata Urban Agglomeration.

Geography
Natibpur is located at 22.665681, 87.887652.

Demographics
As per 2011 Census of India Natibpur had a total population of 7,212 of which 3,663 (51%) were males and 5,549 (49%) were females. Population below 6 years was 971. The total number of literates in Natibpur was 4,881 (78.21% of the population over 6 years).

 India census, Natibpur had a population of 5,707. Males constitute 52% of the population and females 48%. Natibpur has an average literacy rate of 58%, lower than the national average of 59.5%: male literacy is 61%, and female literacy is 54%. In Natibpur, 17% of the population is under 6 years of age.

Transport
Domjur Road railway station and Sankrail railway station are the nearest railway stations.

References

Cities and towns in Howrah district
Neighbourhoods in Kolkata
Kolkata Metropolitan Area